Patiala School for the Blind is a special school for blind children in Patiala city of Panjab. Society for Welfare of the Handicapped started the school in 1967.

The school charges no fees from the students and server from pre-nursery to 12th class. This and Patiala School for the Deaf together have 200 children of which 140 are the deaf and 60 are the blind. Hostel facility is also provided free of cost and currently, 180 students are staying in the hostel. The school also provides uniforms, stationary, meals and others free of cost.

See also 
 Mahant Gurbanta Das School for Deaf & Dumb, Bathinda
 Vatika High School for Deaf & Dumb, Chandigarh
 Patiala School for the Deaf
 Patiala School for the Deaf-blind
 Umeed Red Cross School for Hearing Impaired, Faridkot
 Khosla School for the Deaf, Jalandhar
 School for Deaf, Barnala

References 

Schools for the blind in Punjab
Educational institutions established in 1967
1967 establishments in Punjab, India